Jakob Bro (born April 11, 1978) is a Danish guitarist and composer.

Career
Bro leads a trio with Joey Baron and Thomas Morgan. In the fall of 2016 the trio released the album Streams (ECM). Bro also works with Palle Mikkelborg and Bro/Knak, a collaboration with the Danish electronica producer Thomas Knak.

Bro is a former member of the Paul Motian Band (Garden of Eden, ECM, 2006) and a member of Tomasz Stanko's Dark Eyes Quintet (Dark Eyes, ECM, 2009).

Bro has worked with Paul Bley, Chris Cheek, Andrew D'Angelo, Bill Frisell, George Garzone, Lee Konitz, Thomas Morgan, Paul Motian, Oscar Noriega, Kurt Rosenwinkel, Chris Speed, Ben Street, Mark Turner, David Virelles, and Kenny Wheeler.

Awards and honors
In 2016 and 2013 Bro received The Carl Prize Jazz Composer of the Year for the albums Gefion and Bro/Knak. From 2003–2016 he received six Danish Music Awards: three for Danish Jazz Album of the Year (Gefion, Balladeering and Sidetracked), two for Danish Crossover Album of the Year (Bro/Knak and Sidetracked) and one for New Danish Jazz Artist of the Year (for the album Beautiful Day).

In 2009 and 2013 he received The Jazz Special Prize for Danish Jazz Album of the Year (for the albums Balladeering and December Song) and in 2013 he received The Jazznyt Prize founded by Niels Overgaard (for December Song). In 2012 he received the DJBFA honorary award and in 2006 and 2012. The Danish Arts Foundation rewarded Bro for his recordings Pearl River and Bro/Knak.

In 2014 he was nominated for the Nordic Council Music Prize for his trilogy Balladeering/Time/December Song.

Discography

As leader
 Daydreamer (2003)
 Sidetracked (Loveland, 2005)
  (Loveland, 2007)
 The Stars Are All New Songs (Loveland, 2008)
  (Loveland, 2008)
 Who Said Gay Paree (Loveland, 2008)
 Balladeering (Loveland, 2009)
 Time (Loveland, 2011)
 Bro/Knak (Loveland, 2012)
 December Song (Loveland, 2013)
 Gefion (ECM, 2015)
 Hymnotic/Salmodisk (Loveland, 2015)
 Streams (ECM, 2016)
 Bay of Rainbows (ECM, 2018)
 Returnings (ECM, 2018)
 Uma Elmo (ECM, 2021)

As sideman 
 Paul Motian, Garden of Eden (ECM, 2004)
 Tomasz Stańko, Dark Eyes (ECM, 2009)
 Søren Dahl Jeppesen, Route One (Dog Day, 2010)
 Niels Lyhne Løkkegaard, Vesper (Hiatus, 2012)
 Povl Dissing, That Lucky Old Sun (Stunt, 2010)
 Beautiful Day, Copenhagen Melodrama (Eight Islands, 2022)
 Bandapart, Visions Du Lamarck (Blackout)
 I Got You On Tape, 2 (Auditorium)
 Jonas Westergaard, Helgoland (Stunt)
 Teitur, The Singer (Arlo & Betty)
 Nicolai Munch-Hansen, Wanna Do Right... (Loveland)
 Steffen Brandt, Baby Blue (Alarm)
 Jakob Buchanan, I Land in the Green Land (Buchanan)
 August Rosenbaum, Heights (Hiatus)

References

External links

 
 
 

1978 births
Living people
Danish guitarists
Danish jazz guitarists
Danish jazz musicians
Musicians from Copenhagen
21st-century guitarists